Tiz Kuh (also Romanized as Tīz Kūh) is a village in Afin Rural District, Zohan District, Zirkuh County, South Khorasan Province, Iran. At the 2006 census, its population was 44, in 9 families.

References 

Populated places in Zirkuh County